Eucalyptus piperita, commonly known as Sydney peppermint and urn-fruited peppermint, is a small to medium forest tree native to New South Wales, Australia.

Description
It has grey, rough and finely fibrous bark on its trunk, but its branches are smooth and white. Adult leaves are dull blue-green and often oblique. Bright yellow-green flowers are borne in clusters of seven or more in late spring to mid summer. Fruit is urceolate (urn shaped) to barrel shaped, especially on the sides of valleys.

Taxonomy and naming

Specimens of E. piperita were first collected by First Fleet surgeon and naturalist John White, and published by James Edward Smith in his appendix to White's 1790 Journal of a Voyage to New South Wales. Smith gave it the specific epithet piperita because its odour of its essential oil was so similar to that of Mentha × piperita, the peppermint. White's Voyage also featured a plate showing the plant's leaves and old fruit, but no flowers.

Smith's description was republished in his 1793 A Specimen of the Botany of New Holland, but this did not stop Richard Anthony Salisbury publishing the same plant as Metrosideros aromatica in 1796.

Distribution and habitat
Sydney peppermint occurs in the tablelands and coastal areas of central and southern New South Wales, especially on the sides of valleys.

Uses
The volatile leaf oil of E. piperita has been used in stomach upsets.

E. piperita 'type' has a fresh weight oil yield of 2.25% containing piperitone (40–50%) and phellandrene.

Australian botanist, Joseph Maiden, was of the opinion that Dennis Considen, a surgeon on the First Fleet deserves credit for being the first person to recognize the medicinal value of Eucalyptus oil extracted from E. piperita found growing on the shores of Port Jackson in 1788. This view is based on a letter Considen wrote in November 1788 to an English colleague, Dr Anthony Hamilton, saying that "... we have a large peppermint tree which is equal if not superior to our English peppermint. I have sent you a specimen of it if there is any merit in applying these and many other simples[sic] to the benefit of the poor wretches here, I certainly claim it, being the first who discovered and recommended them". John White, Surgeon General to the Colony, is also credited with the discovery, in documenting the matter and organizing oil samples to be sent back to England. The surgeons initially based their assumptions of the medicinal properties of E. piperita from the similarity of its fragrance to English peppermint.

See also
List of Eucalyptus species

References

piperita
Flora of New South Wales
Myrtales of Australia
Trees of Australia
Taxa named by James Edward Smith
Plants described in 1793